The 2012 Men's European Water Polo Championship took place at the Pieter van den Hoogenband Swim Stadium in Eindhoven, the Netherlands, from 16 to 29 January 2012.

Road to the 2012 Olympics
The championships was part of the qualification procedure for the 2012 London Olympics that will take place in late July and early August of that year. There will be 12 men's teams in the Olympic competition.

By the time that these championships take place, four men's places have already been booked: the winner of the 2011 FINA Men's Water Polo World League in Italy (Serbia), and the three top-placed teams in the 2011 World Championships in Shanghai that did not win the World League (Italy, Croatia, Hungary).

As Great Britain men's team has been entered into the Olympic competition, there was not a direct entry to the Olympic tournament from the European Championships. Five teams will be entered into a world-wide qualifying competition from 1–8 April 2012 for men in Edmonton, Alberta, Canada and from 15 to 22 April for women in Italy. Four teams from this competition qualified for the Olympic tournament.

Qualification

12 teams were allowed to the tournament. The qualification was as follows:
 The host nation
 The best 5 teams from the 2010 European Championships not already qualified as the host nation
 6 teams from the Qualifiers

Squads

Draw 
The draw was held on 12 November 2011.

Groups

Preliminary round

Group A

Group B 

 

Nikolaos Stavropoulos, Teixidó, Paul Schüler

7th–12th Classification 

Bracket

7th–12th places

7th–10th places

11th place

9th place

7th place

Final round 
Bracket

Quarterfinals

Semifinals

5th place

3rd place

Final

Final ranking

Awards

References

External links

LEN website

Men
2012
2012
2012 in Dutch sport
2012 in water polo
January 2012 sports events in Europe
2012 Men's European Water Polo
2012 Men's European Water Polo